Thariode  is a 2021 Malayalam-language documentary film directed by Nirmal Baby Varghese about the history of gold mining in Thariyode and its impact on the environment. The film also focuses other gold mining areas of Malabar on 19th century. The film includes interviews with figures such as historians K. K. N. Kurup, Mundakkayam Gopi, journalist O K Jhonny, and other native persons. The film narrated by
Aliyar.

Plot
Thariode, tells the story of gold mining in Thariyode, one of the most ancient cities of the Malabar region, a long, narrow coastline on the southwestern shore line of the mainland Indian subcontinent. The film also charts the history of gold mining in other areas of Malabar (Thalappuzha, Devala, Nilagiri, Nilambur and Chaliyar) during the 19th century. The film analyses the impact that gold mining –  still one of the dirtiest industries in the world – had on the development of the country, the local livelihoods and the environmental repercussions on nature and the territory.

Soundtrack 
The original background score is composed by British composer Owain Hoskins.

Release
Film started streaming on the American OTT platform Diverse Cinema from 11 June 2022.

Awards and accolades

Awards

Film festival official selections

Remake
On 28 June 2019, director Nirmal announced a fictionalization of Thariode, starring Australian-British actor Bill Hutchens. The cinematic remake is titled "Thariode: The Lost City", and also stars Roger Ward, Luing Andrews, Alexx O'Nell, Courtney Sanello, Amelie Leroy, and Brendan Byrne in supporting roles.

See also
List of Indian documentary films
List of documentary films

References

External links

2021 films
Indian short documentary films
2021 short documentary films
Documentary films about nature
Documentary films about mining
Documentary films about environmental issues
Environmental issues in India
Films about mining
Films shot in Kozhikode